Town Kotha Road, also called Main Road of Visakhapatnam, is one of the important and old business roads in city.

About
It has a key role in the business of Visakhapatnam, almost all types of goods are available on this road from electronics to clothes.

Transport
It is well connected with all parts of the city. City buses are run to every corner of the city: Gajuwaka,  NAD X Road,  Malkapuram, Dwaraka Nagar, Maddilapalem, Arilova, Madhurawada, Aganampudi and Visakhapatnam Steel Plant.

APSRTC routes

References

Neighbourhoods in Visakhapatnam
Roads in Visakhapatnam
Shopping districts and streets in India